This was the first edition of the tournament.

Facundo Bagnis and Sergio Galdós won the title after defeating Robert Galloway and Alex Lawson 6–0, 6–3 in the final.

Seeds

Draw

References

External links
 Main draw

ATP Salzburg Open - Doubles